Erys (stylized in all caps and pronounced "Iris") is the second studio album by American rapper Jaden, released on July 5, 2019, through MSFTSMusic and Roc Nation. It is the follow-up to 2017's Syre, and features collaborations with Tyler, the Creator, Trinidad James, ASAP Rocky, Kid Cudi, Lido, and Willow. The lead single "Again" was released on July 2.

Background
Following the release of his debut studio album Syre in 2017, Jaden announced the follow-up Erys in December of the same year. In September 2018, Smith told Zane Lowe that while he likes "to do it all" and "experiment", "the people have spoken on what they like from me so I try to come really, really hard", describing Erys as a "strict, hard rap album". He went on to say that "every song, back to back, [will be] high tempo, [and have] a lot of bass like just crazy".

Composition
Erys picks up where Jaden Smith left off with the conclusion of Syre the story of a boy who is obsessed with chasing the sunset and until one day it chased him, and it ends up killing him. Erys is a now resurrected part of Syre. The album revolves around Erys and portrays him as a boy whose ego has gotten the best of him. During the album he's portrayed as an ill-mannered person who some might say is the exact opposite of Syre.

Promotion
In April 2019, Smith released the three-track EP Erys Is Coming, and in June, debuted the song "Summertime in Paris" with sister Willow on The Ellen DeGeneres Show.

The song "On My Own" was featured in the PlayStation 4/PlayStation 5 video game Marvel's Spider-Man: Miles Morales.

Critical reception

Upon its release, Erys received generally mixed reviews from contemporary music critics.

Commercial performance
In the United States, Erys debuted at number 12 on the US Billboard 200 chart, earning 23,932 album-equivalent units, with 4,036 coming from pure album sales in its first week.

Track listing
Credits adapted from Apple Music's metadata.

Notes
  signifies a co-producer
 "Beautiful Disruption" previously appeared in the EP Erys Is Coming.
 "Noize" and "Erys" are stylized in all caps.
 "P" features additional vocals by Teo, Willow, and Lido.
 "N" features additional vocals by Tyler Cole, Teo, and Willow.
 "K" features additional vocals by Teo, Harry Hudson, Willow, and Lido.
 "Noize", "i-drip-or-is", "Riot", and "Beautiful Disruption" features additional vocals by OmArr.
 "Summertime in Paris" features additional vocals by Kris Wu, Teo, and Josiah Bell.
 "Pain" features additional vocals by Barbara Pravi and November Ultra.
 "Beautiful Disruption" features uncredited additional vocals and additional production from Omarhu Akbar
 "Somebody Else" features additional vocals by Willow.

Sample credits
 "Beautiful Disruption" contains a sample from "Emotionally Better 164", written by Adam Feeney, and performed by Frank Dukes.

Charts

References

2019 albums
Jaden Smith albums
Roc Nation albums
Albums produced by Tay Keith
Albums produced by Cubeatz
Albums produced by Frank Dukes
Albums produced by Christian Rich